The 2017 Air Force Falcons football team represented the United States Air Force Academy in the 2017 NCAA Division I FBS football season. The Falcons were led by eleventh-year head coach Troy Calhoun and played their home games at Falcon Stadium in Colorado Springs, Colorado. They were members of the Mountain West Conference in the Mountain Division. They finished the season 5–7, 4–4 in Mountain West play to finish in a tie for fourth place in the Mountain Division.

Schedule

Game summaries

VMI

at Michigan

San Diego State

at New Mexico

at Navy

UNLV

at Nevada

at Colorado State

Army

Wyoming

at Boise State

Utah State

References

Air Force
Air Force Falcons football seasons
Air Force Falcons football